John Page (died after 1417) was a member of the Parliament of England for the constituency of Maldon in Essex in the parliaments of 1391, 1402, and 1407.

References 

Members of Parliament for Maldon
15th-century English people
Year of birth unknown
Year of death unknown